Joseph Perez (born August 12, 1999) is an American professional baseball third baseman for the Houston Astros of Major League Baseball (MLB). He made his MLB debut in 2022.

Amateur career
Perez attended Archbishop McCarthy High School in Southwest Ranches, Florida. As a senior, he hit .526 with nine home runs and 37 runs batted in (RBIs) and went 4–0 with a 1.88 earned run average (ERA) and 40 strikeouts as a pitcher. He was drafted by the Houston Astros in the second round of the 2017 Major League Baseball draft. He signed, forgoing his commitment to play college baseball at the University of Miami.

Professional career
Perez made his professional debut in 2018 with the Gulf Coast Astros, batting .364 over 11 at-bats, and played 2019 with the Tri-City ValleyCats, hitting .188 with seven home runs and 27 RBIs over fifty games. Due to the cancellation of the 2020 Minor League Baseball season because of the COVID-19 pandemic, he did not play for a team. Perez started 2021 with the Fayetteville Woodpeckers before being promoted to the Asheville Tourists and Corpus Christi Hooks. Over 106 games between the three teams, he slashed .291/.354/.495 with 18 home runs, 61 RBIs, and 34 doubles. Perez was selected to the 40-man roster following the season on November 19, 2021.

On April 8, 2022, the Astros called Perez up to the major leagues for the first time and made his MLB debut that night. He spent the remainder of the year in the minor leagues, slashing .290/.359/.417 with 7 home runs and 37 RBI in 83 games for four minor league affiliates.

Perez was optioned to the Triple-A Sugar Land Space Cowboys to begin the 2023 season.

References

External links

1999 births
Living people
Sportspeople from Pembroke Pines, Florida
Baseball players from Florida
Major League Baseball third basemen
Houston Astros players
Gulf Coast Astros players
Tri-City ValleyCats players
Fayetteville Woodpeckers players
Asheville Tourists players
Corpus Christi Hooks players
Sugar Land Space Cowboys players